St. Peter's Catholic Church, also known as Brush Creek Church, is a historic Roman Catholic church located near Rensselaer, Ralls County, Missouri.  The church was built about 1862, and is a one-story, rectangular limestone building with limestone and sandstone ornamentation. It is topped by a gable roof with belfry.  It features lancet windows and has a frame two-room addition sheathed in weatherboard. It is the church on the site where Augustus Tolton, the first ordained African American Catholic priest, was baptized.

It was listed on the National Register of Historic Places in 1980.

References

African-American history of Missouri
Churches in the Roman Catholic Diocese of Jefferson City
Churches on the National Register of Historic Places in Missouri
Roman Catholic churches completed in 1862
Churches in Ralls County, Missouri
1862 establishments in Missouri
National Register of Historic Places in Ralls County, Missouri
19th-century Roman Catholic church buildings in the United States